Look at Me: The Album is a compilation album of various songs by rapper XXXTentacion. It was released on June 10, 2022, 8 days before the fourth anniversary of his death. The album was announced alongside a documentary of the same name. Look at Me was supported by two singles: "Vice City" and "True Love", both of which were announced early on that they would be appearing on streaming music services such as Spotify, both of which were previously absent mostly due to sample clearance problems. The album features both Ski Mask the Slump God and Kanye West.

Background
The album was originally announced on May 23, 2022, by XXXTentacion's estate on his social media, along with the announcement that "True Love" with Kanye West, which was previously on West's eleventh studio album, Donda 2, would be released as a single on streaming platforms on May 27, 2022. The full tracklist was revealed on XXXTentacion's social media on June 2, 2022.

The album features various songs from XXXTentacion's SoundCloud era, in addition to album tracks and singles from his mixtape Revenge (2017) and three of his studio albums, 17 (2017), ? (2018), and Skins (2018), including his breakthrough single, "Look at Me!", and his Diamond-certified single, "Sad!".

Track listing

Notes
 "Vice City" is from XXX (Unmastered).
 "Never" is from The Fall, Heartbreak Hotel & Willy Wonka Was a Child Murderer.
 "Rare" is from ♡ r a r e ♡.
 "Fuxk" is from Members Only, Vol. 1.
 "WingRiddenAngel" and "King of the Dead" are from Members Only, Vol. 2.
 "WingRiddenAngel" is from "Heartbreak Hotel".
 "Willy Wonka Was a Child Murderer" is from Willy Wonka Was a Child Murderer.
 "Look at Me!", "I Don't Wanna Do This Anymore", and "Yung Bratz" are from Revenge.
 "Yung Bratz" is from the 2016 version of Bad Vibes Forever.
 "Jocelyn Flores", "Depression & Obsesssion", and "Everyone Dies in Their Nightmares" are from 17.
 "Alone, Part 3", "Moonlight", "Sad!", "Changes", "Hope", and "Before I Close My Eyes" are from ?.
 "Train Food" is from Skins.
 "True Love" is from Donda 2.

Charts

Weekly charts

Year-end charts

Certifications

References

2022 compilation albums
XXXTentacion albums
Compilation albums published posthumously
Columbia Records compilation albums
Albums produced by Ronny J
Emo compilation albums
Hip hop compilation albums
Contemporary R&B compilation albums
Albums produced by Kanye West
Albums produced by Mike Dean (record producer)